Roy Kenneth Fairman (February 23, 1912 – March 8, 1994) was an American college sportsman, basketball coach, athletics administrator, and local politician.  He served as the head basketball coach at Princeton University from 1935 to 1938, compiling a record of 25–38.  He was the athletic director at Princeton from 1941 to 1972 with a hiatus during World War II, in which he served as a United States Army officer.  Fairman was the mayor of Princeton Township, New Jersey from 1959 to 1963.

References

External links

1912 births
1994 deaths
All-American college men's basketball players
American football ends
Mayors of Princeton, New Jersey
Princeton Tigers athletic directors
Princeton Tigers football players
Princeton Tigers men's basketball coaches
Princeton Tigers men's basketball players
Princeton Tigers men's lacrosse players
United States Army personnel of World War II
United States Army officers
People from Spring Valley, New York
20th-century American politicians
Players of American football from Syracuse, New York
Lacrosse players from New Jersey
Basketball coaches from New York (state)
Basketball players from Syracuse, New York
American men's basketball coaches
American men's basketball players
Military personnel from New Jersey